Atlantic Coast Line may refer to:

 Atlantic Coast Line Railroad, in the United States
 Atlantic Coast Line, Cornwall, in the United Kingdom